Le Bestiaire ou Cortège d'Orphée is a poetic album of 30 short poems by Guillaume Apollinaire with woodcuts by Raoul Dufy, published in 1911.

The Poems
Guillaume Apollinaire, was a bibliophile and a specialist in medieval bestiaries. In 1906, Picasso, a friend of Apollinaire's, had made some experimental woodcuts of animals. Apollinaire published eighteen poems figuring all kinds of semi-mythical animals  in 1908 in La phalange, an experimental journal and promised his readers an illustrated edition. Picasso was not willing to cooperate and the poet persuaded Raoul Dufy, an engraver, to provide the woodcuts. Orpheus is present in four of the 30 poems.

Music
Several composers were inspired by these poems to set them to music: Francis Poulenc (1919), Louis Durey (1919), Jean Absil (1944) and others. Francis Poulenc originally selected twelve poems, but only published six. His friend Louis Durey composed a complete cycle (26 short songs; he omitted the poems about Orpheus). Both wrote for baritone solo accompanied by piano.

Northern Irish composer Alan Mills set six of the poems to music (for baritone and piano) in 1985.

Bibliography
Guillaume Apollinaire, Le Bestiaire ou Cortège d'Orphée, illustrations de Raoul Dufy, Deplanche, 1911 - La Sirène, 1919.
Guillaume Apollinaire, Le Bestiaire ou Cortège d'Orphée, lithographies en couleurs de Jean Picart Le Doux, Les Bibliophiles de France, 1962.

References

External links
Le Bestiaire ou Cortège d'Orphée : Deux poèmes refusés (Le Condor, Le Morpion) on Gallica
Guillaume Apollinaire All poems with illustrations and translations
 From Poetry to Songs: Hare, Rabbit and Sirens in Apollinaire’s Bestiary 

Works by Guillaume Apollinaire
1911 poems
French poetry